Manchester City Council is the local authority for Manchester, a city and metropolitan borough in Greater Manchester, England. Manchester is the sixth largest city in England by population. Its city council is composed of 96 councillors, three for each of the 32 electoral wards of Manchester. The council is controlled by the Labour Party and led by Bev Craig. The official opposition is the  Green Party with three councillors. Joanne Roney is the chief executive. Many of the council's staff are based at Manchester Town Hall.

History

Manchester was incorporated in 1838 under the Municipal Corporations Act 1835 as the Corporation of Manchester or Manchester Corporation. It achieved city status in 1853, only the second such grant since the Reformation. The area included in the city has been increased many times, in 1885 (Bradford, Harpurhey and Rusholme), 1890 (Blackley, Crumpsall, part of Droylsden, Kirkmanshulme, Moston, Newton Heath, Openshaw, and West Gorton), 1903 (Heaton), 1904 (Burnage, Chorlton cum Hardy, Didsbury, and Moss Side), 1909 (Gorton, and Levenshulme), 1931 (Wythenshawe: Baguley, Northenden, and Northen Etchells), and Ringway in 1974. A new Town Hall was opened in 1877 (by Alderman Abel Heywood) and the Mayor of Manchester was granted the title of Lord Mayor in 1893.

Under the Local Government Act 1972 the council was reconstituted as a metropolitan borough council in 1974, and since then it has been controlled by the Labour Party. In 1980, Manchester was the first council to declare itself a nuclear-free zone. In 1984 it formed an equal opportunities unit as part of its opposition to Section 28.

Political make-up

Elections are usually by thirds (a third of the seats elected, three years in every four), although the 2018 and 2004 elections saw all seats contested due to substantial boundary changes. Labour has controlled a majority of seats in every election since the council was reconstituted in 1974. Between 2014 and 2016 Labour occupied every seat with no opposition. In the local elections held on 5 May 2016, former Manchester Withington MP, John Leech, was elected with 53% of the vote signifying the first gain for any party other than Labour for the first time in six years in Manchester and providing an opposition for the first time in two years. On 7 March 2017, it was reported that City Centre councillor Kevin Peel had been suspended from the Manchester Labour group after reports of bullying. He sat as an independent, still taking the Labour Group whip until he rejoined Labour. On 24 July 2019 it was reported that Majid Dar (Ancoats and Beswick) had been suspended by the Labour party.

Coat of arms 
 
A coat of arms was granted to the Manchester Corporation in 1842, passing on to Manchester City Council when the borough of Manchester was granted the title of city in 1853.
The Shield: red (Gules) with three gold (Or) bands drawn diagonally across to the right hand side.
The Chief (the white (Argent) top segment): shows a ship at sea in full sail. This is a reference to the city's trading base.
The Crest: On a multicoloured wreath stands a terrestrial globe, signifying Manchester's world trade, and covered by a swarm of flying bees. The bee was adopted in the 19th century as a symbol of industrial Manchester being the birthplace of the Industrial Revolution.
The Supporters: On the left, a heraldic antelope with a chain attached to a gold (Or) collar, representing engineering industries, and hanging at the shoulder, the red rose of Lancashire, reflecting Manchester's historic position in Lancashire. On the right, a golden lion stands guardant (facing us), crowned with a red (Gules) castle (a reference to the Roman fort at Castlefield from which the city originated). The lion also wears the Red Rose of Lancashire.
Motto: Concilio et Labore, loosely translated "By wisdom and effort" (or "By counsel and hard work").

In 1954, Manchester Corporation successfully took the Manchester Palace of Varieties to court for improperly using the Corporation's arms in its internal decoration and its company seal. The case of Manchester Corporation v Manchester Palace of Varieties Ltd; was the first sitting of the Court of Chivalry for two hundred years, and it has not sat since.

In April 2013, Manchester City Council threatened to take legal action against The Manchester Gazette, for its use of the City's coat of arms on their website. The News Outlet claimed it already gained permission and continued to use it for a further 8 months in spite of the warnings. Withington MP John Leech described the Council's latest move as a "massive over-reaction and waste of money", adding: "Have the council’s legal department got nothing better to do?"

Controversies 
On 14 April 2010, the BBC reported that council leader Richard Leese had stood down temporarily from his post as leader of Manchester City Council after having been arrested on suspicion of the common assault of his 16-year-old stepdaughter. He was released after accepting a police caution and admitting striking his stepdaughter across the face.

On 7 March 2017, it was reported that City Centre councillor Kevin Peel had been suspended from the Manchester Labour group after reports of bullying. He sat as an independent, still taking the Labour Group whip until he rejoined Labour. He did not stand in the following election.

On 12 February 2019, an 'enormous political row'  erupted after Manchester Council announced it was consulting the public on a new Public Spare Protection Order which, among other things, targeted 'aggressive' begging and rough sleepers who pitch tents or sleep in doorways. The council's opposition leader, and former Lib Dem MP John Leech sparked further controversy when he tweeted that the potential council policy which was still out for public consultation was "absolute crap".

On 8 March 2019, at a routine council budget meeting, a row erupted before proceedings began. The argument was prompted by a sign put up by Labour above the Lord Mayor's chair at the front of the council chamber, reading '10 Years of Tory And Lib Dem Cuts'. When Leech, the Lib Dem leader, entered the chamber, he took down the message – prompting senior Labour councillor Pat Karney to 'thunder' across the chamber. He began 'screaming' and 'shouting' at Leech, and told him to hand over the laminated A4 pieces of paper at least 11 times.

On 15 April 2019, The Times uncovered a number of offensive tweets from Fallowfield Labour councillor Jade Doswell. Doswell had tweeted that she was a "little bit sick in my mouth" at the sight of an Israeli flag and claimed the flag was 'offensive' and provocative’. She apologised on a private Facebook post.

On 25 July 2019, it was reported that Majid Dar had shared Facebook comparing justifications made by the Nazis for the slaughter of Jews during the Holocaust with those made by Israel's army for its actions in Gaza. Another post stated that Zionism 'keeps changing direction like a snake', whilst replies to one of his other comments included 'Kill all the Jews PERIOD' and 'Israel needs to stop existing'.

On 18 March 2020, Greg Stanton stood down from the Liberal Democrats to sit as an Independent councillor. Although Stanton cited his reasons for leaving as "because I could no longer support [John Leech's] leadership", the Liberal Democrats told the Manchester Evening News that Stanton was under "investigation for unacceptable and obstructive behaviour". Stanton stated that the statement was "misleading".

On 20 March 2020, The Manchester Evening News ran an article on Independent councillor Kenneth Dobson (who represents Clayton and Openshaw), after he spread conspiracy theories suggesting that the outbreak of COVID-19 was faked. A series of tweets labelling COVID-19 a 'bogus virus' and a 'load of bol**x' were posted on his Twitter page, alongside images posted describing the pandemic as 'propaganda' and conflating the spread of the virus with the rollout of 5G wireless networks.

On 22 June 2020, Manchester Council's executive member for Finance and Human Resources was suspended by the Labour group, after allegations of sexual abuse were made against him on Twitter.

Wards
The council wards are listed under their parliamentary constituency below.

Councillors 
Each ward is represented by three councillors.

 Elected as Labour but joined the Green party in July 2022

 Elected as a Liberal Democrat but joined Labour in April 2020

References

Further reading
McKechnie, H. M. (ed.) (1915) Manchester in Nineteen Hundred and Fifteen. Manchester U. P.; "Undertakings of the City Council; Social Amelioration in Manchester; Elementary Education in Manchester; Secondary Schools in Manchester; The Evening School System of Manchester", by E. D. Simon, et al.
Manchester City Council. "Concilio et Labore" Series. No. 1-11. (Each pamphlet describes part of the council's work, e.g. no. 4: the City Treasurer.
Redford, Arthur (1939) The History of City Government in Manchester; Vol. 2 & 3: Borough and City; The Last Half Century.
Simon, Ernest D. (1926) A City Council from Within. London: Longmans, Green
Simon, Shena D. (1938) A Century of City Government: Manchester 1838–1938. London: G. Allen & Unwin
Tomlinson, H. E. (1943) "The Heraldry of Manchester" in: Bulletin of the John Rylands Library; vol. XXVIII, pp. 207–27

External links
Manchester City Council
Manchester Green Party
Manchester Labour Party
Manchester Liberal Democrats

 
Local government in Manchester
Metropolitan district councils of England
Local authorities in Greater Manchester
Local education authorities in England
Billing authorities in England
Leader and cabinet executives
1974 establishments in England